Veraguas is a province of Panama.

Veraguas may also refer to:

 Veragua or Veraguas, the name of five Spanish colonial territorial entities in Central America, beginning in the 16th century 
 Veraguas culture, or Chiriqui culture, a pre-Columbian Panamian culture
 Veraguas Club Deportivo, a Panama football team
 F.C. Veraguas 2010, a Panama football team

See also
 Veraguas parakeet